WDSY-HD2 is an urban contemporary radio station in Pittsburgh, Pennsylvania, which carries the WAMO 107.3 branding from its translator at W297BU, also located in Pittsburgh. WDSY-HD2 is currently simulcasting WAMO along with the translator which is owned by Martz Communications Group and operated by Audacy via LMA. With the impending sale, WAMO will be sold to Pittsburgh Public Media in which the translator will rebroadcast WDSY-HD2.

References

DSY-HD2